Meriania costata is a species of plant in the family Melastomataceae. It is endemic to Ecuador. Its natural habitat is subtropical or tropical moist montane forests.

See also 
 Myrtaceae

References

Endemic flora of Ecuador
costata
Endangered plants
Taxonomy articles created by Polbot
Plants described in 1967